Jessie Da Costa (born 23 January 1997) is a French karateka. He won one of the bronze medals in the men's kumite 84 kg event at the 2021 World Karate Championships held in Dubai, United Arab Emirates. In 2018, he won the silver medal in the men's 84 kg event at the Mediterranean Games held in Tarragona, Spain.

In 2016, he won one of the bronze medals in the under-21 men's 84 kg event at the EKF Cadet, Junior and under-21 Championships held in Limassol, Cyprus. He won one of the bronze medals in his event at the 2016 World University Karate Championships held in Braga, Portugal.

He competed in the men's kumite 84 kg event at the 2022 World Games held in Birmingham, United States.

His brothers Logan Da Costa and Steven Da Costa also compete in karate.

Achievements

References

External links 
 

Living people
1997 births
French male karateka
Competitors at the 2018 Mediterranean Games
Mediterranean Games silver medalists for France
Mediterranean Games medalists in karate
Competitors at the 2022 World Games
21st-century French people